Congolacerta asukului  also known as Asukulu's grass lizard, is a species of lizard endemic to the Democratic Republic of the Congo.

Etymology
Congolacerta asukului is named in honour of Itombwe zoologist Asukulu M’Mema.

References

Congolacerta
Reptiles of the Democratic Republic of the Congo
Endemic fauna of the Democratic Republic of the Congo
Reptiles described in 2011
Taxa named by Eli Greenbaum
Taxa named by Cesar O. Villanueva
Taxa named by Chifundera Kusamba
Taxa named by Mwenebatu M. Aristote
Taxa named by William Roy Branch